Aero the Acro-Bat is a 1993 video game developed by Iguana Entertainment and published by Sunsoft. It was released for both the Super Nintendo Entertainment System and Sega Genesis. Aero the Acro-Bat, a red anthropomorphic bat, was created by David Siller. In 2002, Metro 3D released a version of the game for the Game Boy Advance, with a battery back-up (which the original versions lacked). The Super NES version of the game was released on the Wii's Virtual Console in the PAL region on July 23 and in North America on July 26, 2010.

A sequel, Aero the Acro-Bat 2, was released in 1994, followed by the spin-off Zero the Kamikaze Squirrel.

Plot
A spoiled, rich kid named Edgar Ektor was a regular attendant at The World of Amusement Circus and Funpark, but was banned after a failed prank almost killed a lion. 20 years later, Edgar became a powerful and evil industrialist. Aided by Zero the Kamikaze Squirrel and his Psycho Circus gang, Edgar sabotages the funpark and kidnaps all the circus performers. Aero the Acro-Bat is the circus' greatest star and the only hope for rescuing the performers (including his girlfriend Aeriel) and putting a stop to Edgar's evil schemes.

Gameplay
The levels are played in typical 2D platforming style. In order to clear them, the player must accomplish certain tasks so that the exit warp can be revealed. Those tasks include passing through hoops, stepping on platforms until they disappear, riding roller coasters, etc. There are four worlds with five levels in each one, and the levels are large, many of them containing awkwardly positioned spikes that kill instantly.

Aero can attack enemies by shooting limited stars or by doing an aerial diagonal drill attack at his target when he is in the air.

If enough points are collected at the end of a level, a bonus level can be played, in which Aero has to dive into a pool. The bonus level is a vertical platform level in the Genesis version. When Sunsoft converted the game for the Super NES they changed the bonus level to utilise Mode 7 as a straightforward level to maneuver above an overworld map.

Development 
For many years David Siller had ideas for the game's character in his head. He first sketched the concept of Aero in 1992. Although Aero's early designs resemble a human acrobat, Siller always intended him to be a bat. The gameplay mechanics were partly based on Namco's Mappy series.  By this time, Siller had agreed to join Sunsoft of America.

The final concept was designed by David's son Justin Siller, who was inspired by mixed themes from the 70s and 80s. Some of the enemies, items and in-levels that Siller proposed never made it in the finished game. The concept included a mission objective feature, which was not added in the original release. However it was implemented and modified in the Game Boy Advance version. Originally Aero was going to be released for the original Nintendo Entertainment System, but by this time 16-bit consoles were on the market, so the NES version was cancelled. Much of the game's work took place at Orange County, California. Both the Super NES and Genesis versions were being worked on simultaneously, but the Genesis version was released earlier as the Super NES version reached its final stages of development.

Plans were made by Sunsoft to port the game to Atari Jaguar sometime in 1994, but this version was never released.

After the success of the sequels, Siller left Sunsoft and joined Universal Interactive. Universal bought the rights of Siller's character and were intent on making Aero their mascot. He had intended to start up a sequel to the second game titled "Aero the Acrobat 3D" to be released on PlayStation to complete the series as a trilogy, but this concept never reached development, as Universal turned their attention to Crash Bandicoot. Following the success of that game, Crash was their official mascot instead of Aero. With no success in starting a new Acro-Bat game, Siller bought back Aero as he left Universal. While Siller worked at Capcom, the USA Bill Gardner wanted to make use of Aero, but the Japanese HQ denied that request in accordance to Siller's contract.

By summer 2002, Siller had to relocate to Texas. He did not have the funds to form his own studio, but was able to hire Atomic Planet to port his original game to the Game Boy Advance. Metro 3D found the game very promising for marketing and Siller directed the port during its development. In addition Siller wanted to port the two sequels Aero the Acro-Bat 2 and Zero the Kamikaze Squirrel on Game Boy Advance in near future and compile them in a collection called "A-Z Force", but he cancelled those plans in favor of designing original games.

Release

Promotional artwork of the game was shown at 1993 Winter Consumer Electronics Show in Nevada as well as the prototype version at the 1993 Summer Consumer Electronics Show in Chicago, where it stood out well above other exhibits. Aero the Acro-Bat was made Sunsoft's new mascot. By late 1993, Sunsoft was giving away free copies of the Super NES or Genesis version of the game to the first 100 people that sent them a 3x5 postcard to their address.

Reception

Electronic Gaming Monthly gave the Super NES version an 8.3 out of 10 and the Genesis version a 7.6 out of 10. They criticized the absence of the exceptionally good music of the Super NES version but held it to still be an excellent game with its large, challenging levels. They also awarded Aero the Acro-Bat Best New Character of 1993. NintendoLife gave the Virtual Console release of the Super NES version a 6 out of 10.

Four reviewers in GameFan gave the Genesis version 93, 97, 87, and 90 Video Games: The Ultimate Gaming Magazine gave both the Genesis and SNES versions 8 out of 10.

Conversely, Digital Press gave the game only 3 out of 10.

Notes

References

External links

Justin Siller's website

1993 video games
Atomic Planet Entertainment games
Cancelled Atari Jaguar games
Cancelled Nintendo Entertainment System games
Game Boy Advance games
Metro3D games
Platform games
Sega Genesis games
Side-scrolling platform games
Single-player video games
Sunsoft games
Super Nintendo Entertainment System games
Video games about animals
Video games developed in the United States
Video games set in amusement parks
Virtual Console games